Pogranichny is a shield volcano in central Kamchatka. It is the highest and the easternmost among three shield volcanoes located north-east of Cherny volcano in the central Sredinny Range.

See also
 List of volcanoes in Russia

References

External links
 Pogranychny at NASA

Volcanoes of the Kamchatka Peninsula
Mountains of the Kamchatka Peninsula
Shield volcanoes of Russia
Holocene shield volcanoes
Holocene Asia